The imzad (alternately amzad) is a single-string bowed instrument used by the Tuareg people in Africa.

Its body is made out of a calabash or wood which is covered by animal skin. The strings are made from horse hair and are connected near the neck, and runs over a two-part bridge. The round bow is also equipped with horse hair.

The imzad is only played by the women for example to accompany songs, often during an evening ceremony called takket.  However, there are modern attempts to promote the instrument as inherent to Tuareg culture.

References

External links 
   Project page "Sauver l'imzad" with images and music examples 

Violins
Tuareg musical instruments